Ma Ainong (born September 1964) is a Chinese translator of literary works, especially children's literature, from English. She is famous for her translation of J. K. Rowling's Harry Potter series.

Biography
Ma was born in Nanjing, Jiangsu, in September 1964. Her grandfather Ma Qinghuai was also a translator. Her sister Ma Aixin is also a translator of children's literature. Her parent are editors. In 1982, she entered Nanjing University, majoring in English at the Department of Foreign Language, where she graduated in 1986. After university, she taught at Nanjing Medical University as an English teacher. In 1990 she became a postgraduate student at Beijing Foreign Studies University. After graduating in 1993 she worked as an editor at the Foreign Language Editorial Room of People's Literature Publishing House.

Translations
 Legend of Narnia: Lions, Witches and Wardrobes
 Little House on the Prairie
 Anne of Green Gables
 The Wonderful Wizard of Oz
 Black Beauty
 The Little Bookroom: The Glass Peacock
 The Little Bookroom: Miracle of the Poor Island
 Five Children and It
 Alice's Adventures in Wonderland
 The Luminaries
 Tom's Midnight Garden
 Andersen's Fairy Tales
 Guardians of Ga'Hoole
 Harry Potter series
 The Silkworm
 The Tales of Beedle the Bard
 Pax
 The Mystery of Bessie's Growth
 Ginger of the Paiys
 The Dreamer of Fire Valley
 The Railway Children
 Magic Castle
 My Friend Zachary
 Peter Pan
 Ben and Me
 Little Miss
 Theft of Prince McCream
 Dead Poets Society
 The Little Old Lady Who Was Not Afraid Of Anything
 Naked Lunch
 Where Angels Fear to Tread
 An Artist of the Floating World
 Going Home Again
 The Hill Bachelors
 Rabbit Hill
 The Gift of the Magi

Awards
 2014 Claire Keegan's Walking on the blue field Irish-Chinese Literature Translation Prize
 IBBY Translation Award

References

1964 births
Living people
Writers from Nanjing
Nanjing University alumni
Beijing Foreign Studies University alumni
English–Chinese translators
People's Republic of China translators